Odair Sanches is an amateur basketball guard from Cape Verde. Sanches plays for the basketball side of Seven Stars. He played with Cape Verde at the FIBA Africa Championship 2007 in Angola and won the bronze medal.

References

Year of birth missing (living people)
Living people
Cape Verdean men's basketball players
Guards (basketball)